The Raduga K-10S (NATO reporting name: AS-2 Kipper) was a Soviet supersonic anti-ship missile that was usually nuclear-armed, designed by MKB Raduga. Its development began in 1955, and it entered service with the Soviet armed forces in 1961. The Kipper missile was a very large one, approximately the size of a small jet fighter, because of the rather primitive state of anti-ship missile technology in the 1950s and 1960s. This missile was never used in combat anywhere.

The typical AS-2 launch platform, the Tu-16K-10 Badger C, could carry a single AS-2, semi-recessed in the bomb bay.  The Kipper's long range enabled it to be launched, hypothetically, from beyond the range of any shipboard surface-to-air missiles or anti-aircraft guns of that time. The only defense against the Kipper was the naval jet fighter aircraft, operating from either an aircraft carrier or a shore airfield.

In flight tests, the Kipper cruised on its approach to a target at an altitude of about 10,000 meters, using inertial guidance until it reaches a range of about 100 to 110 kilometers from the target, where it enters a shallow 15 degree dive, commanded by a mid-course update via radio link. When it reaches a range of 60 to 70 kilometers it levels out at an altitude of between 800 and 1,000 meters where it cruises until it reaches a range of 10 to 16 kilometers, when the missile's active radar homing guidance is engaged. It then enters a dive, striking the target vessel close to or below the waterline.

Variants
 K-10S
 P-40 naval - SSM GLCM variant

Specifications
 Length: 9.75 m
 Wing span: 4.18 m
 Diameter: 1 m
 Launch weight: 4,533 kg
 Warhead weight: 1000kg SAP or 350 kt nuclear
 Range: 110 km to 325 km
 Launch altitude: 1,500 to 11,000 m
 Cruise speed: 
 Engine: Alexander Mikulin M-9FK

References

 

Cold War anti-ship missiles of the Soviet Union
Nuclear air-to-surface missiles
Nuclear cruise missiles of the Soviet Union
K-010S
K-010S
MKB Raduga products
Military equipment introduced in the 1960s